Shova may refer to:

 Hamida Banu Shova (born 1954), Bangladeshi politician and founder and chairperson of Queens University, Bangladesh
 Princess Shova Shahi of Nepal (born 1949)
 Shova or Sobha, Nepal, a village development committee
 , a Second World War Royal Navy trawler - see List of requisitioned trawlers of the Royal Navy (WWII)